Menifee is a city in Riverside County, California, United States, and is part of the Inland Empire. Named after a local miner, Luther Menifee Wilson, it was settled in the 19th century, and established as an independent city in 2008. Since then, Menifee has become one of the fastest growing cities in California and the United States.

The city is centrally located in Southern California in the Menifee Valley. The incorporated City of Menifee includes the communities of Sun City, Quail Valley, and Romoland.

History

The area was originally inhabited by the Luiseño people, specifically the Pechanga band. In the 18th century, the area fell under Spanish rule and was ceded by Mexico to the United States in 1848 as a result of the Mexican–American War.

Farming, which began in the mid-19th century, was concentrated in the Menifee area. Mining began in the early 1880s with the discovery of a significant quartz lode by miner Luther Menifee Wilson, from whom Menifee derived its name. Wilson discovered a gold-bearing quartz ledge near present day Holland and Murrieta roads in 1883, and filed a claim with the San Diego County Recorder’s office for this new “Menifee” mine. At the time, the area was referred to as the Menifee Valley.

Early development of the Menifee area began with Sun City in the early 1960s, conceptualized as an active retirement community by Del Webb, a building contractor from Phoenix, Arizona. Webb also developed Sun City, Arizona, under the same concept. Sun City is located in the northwestern part of Menifee and features a mix of residential and commercial activity.

The Menifee area later grew during the late 1980s and early 1990s as a master-planned community. However, a lack of resources such as industry-oriented occupations and high-density retail and commercial businesses caused many residents to drive to cities such as Temecula or Murrieta to shop, dine, or work. In recent years, however, there has been substantial growth in Menifee, attracting many new residents from all areas of Southern California such as San Diego, Orange County and Los Angeles, as well as other parts of the Inland Empire.

On June 3, 2008, the residents of the communities encompassing the Menifee area voted to incorporate together to form Riverside County's 26th city. The new City of Menifee was officially established on October 1, 2008.

Geography
The city of Menifee is bordered on the north, west, south and east by the cities of Perris, Canyon Lake, Lake Elsinore, Wildomar, Murrieta, and the community of Winchester. The city center of Menifee lies at the intersection of Newport Road and Interstate 215.

According to the United States Census Bureau, the city covers an area of 46.6 square miles (120.7 km2), 99.70% of it land, and 0.30% of it water.

Climate

Menifee has mild winters and hot dry Summers.
 On average, the warmest month is August.
 On average, the coldest month is December.
 The maximum average precipitation occurs in February.

Menifee has a Mediterranean climate or Dry-Summer Subtropical (Köppen climate classification Csa). Menifee enjoys plenty of sunshine throughout the year, with an average of 263 sunshine days and only 35 days with measurable precipitation annually of 12.51 inches of rainfall.

At times, during the winter, large dust storms may form due to the large mass of humidity and low, flat land.

Demographics

The 2010 United States Census reported that Menifee had a population of 77,519. The racial makeup of Menifee was 55,444 (71.5%) White (54.2% Non-Hispanic White), 3,858 (5.0%) African American, 655 (0.8%) Native American, 3,788 (4.9%) Asian, 296 (0.4%) Pacific Islander, 9,642 (12.4%) from other races, and 3,837 (4.9%) from two or more races. Hispanic or Latino of any race were 25,551 persons (33.0%).

The 2010 Census reported that 77,331 people (99.8% of the population) lived in households, 81 (0.1%) lived in non-institutionalized group quarters, and 107 (0.1%) were institutionalized.

There were 27,461 households, out of which 9,729 (35.4%) had children under the age of 18 living in them, 15,405 (56.1%) were opposite-sex married couples living together, 2,743 (10.0%) had a female householder with no husband present, 1,324 (4.8%) had a male householder with no wife present. There were 1,348 (4.9%) unmarried opposite-sex partnerships, and 184 (0.7%) same-sex married couples or partnerships. 6,591 households (24.0%) were made up of individuals, and 4,153 (15.1%) had someone living alone who was 65 years of age or older. The average household size was 2.82. There were 19,472 families (70.9% of all households); the average family size was 3.35.

The population was spread out, with 20,067 people (25.9%) under the age of 18, 6,460 people (8.3%) aged 18 to 24, 18,771 people (24.2%) aged 25 to 44, 17,571 people (22.7%) aged 45 to 64, and 14,650 people (18.9%) who were 65 years of age or older. The median age was 38.1 years. For every 100 females, there were 92.8 males. For every 100 females age 18 and over, there were 88.9 males.

The homeowner vacancy rate was 4.1%; the rental vacancy rate was 6.8%. 58,330 people (75.2% of the population) lived in owner-occupied housing units and 19,001 people (24.5%) lived in rental housing units.

During 20092013, Menifee had a median household income of $54,903, with 10.3% of the population living below the federal poverty line.

Economy

Top employers

According to the city's 2021 Comprehensive Annual Financial Report, the ten largest employers in the city are:

Parks and recreation

As of December 2022, Menifee possesses 38 parks, of which 16 are city-owned and 23 are Valley-wide owned parks.

The  Action Sports Park in Menifee is the largest extreme bike park of its kind in Southern California.

Government

On June 3, 2008, voters elected to incorporate Menifee as a general law city. The new City of Menifee was officially established on October 1, 2008, and is the 26th city located within Riverside County. It was first governed by a five-member city council, with Wallace Edgerton as the mayor. Edgerton was re-appointed mayor for a second term in 2009, and for a third term in 2010.

In 2011, John Denver was appointed mayor by city council, after the city's people requested a change in leadership at city council meetings.

In November 2012, Scott Mann was elected mayor. In November 2014, Scott Mann was re-elected mayor.

In 2016, Neil Winter was elected mayor, defeating Mann, who unsuccessfully ran for a third term. Mann's FPPC violation of using campaign funding for personal funding was believed to have helped Winter to win the election. Mann resigned office early after being formally censured by city council, and Greg August served as acting mayor for 20 days until Winter was sworn in.

On May 19, 2018, Mayor Winter unexpectedly died in office, due to an apparent heart attack. Councilwoman Lesa Sobek took up mayoral responsibilities as mayor pro tempore following Winter's death. After 60 days, Bill Zimmerman was indirectly elected Mayor of Menifee in a 3-1 decision by the city council, on July 18, 2018. In November 2020, Zimmerman was re-elected to serve a four-year term as Mayor. His term expires in December 2024.

Menifee initially operated off of indirect elections for its mayors, with city council members appointing the mayor for one-year terms. In 2012, Scott Mann became the first directly elected mayor, for a two-year term. In 2016, voters approved a measure to increase mayoral terms from two to four years. After Winter's death in 2018, Zimmerman was indirectly elected by the city council to fill the remainder of Winter's term.

Education

Elementary and middle school level education in Menifee is provided by the Menifee Union School District and Romoland School District, which serves most of Menifee as well as parts of Lake Elsinore, Wildomar and Murrieta, and the unincorporated community of French Valley. High school students attend school in the Perris Union High School District, which includes Paloma Valley High School and Heritage High School.

Menifee is also home to the Menifee Valley Campus of Mt. San Jacinto College, which serves the Temecula, Murrieta and Menifee areas and is known as the fastest-growing community college in California. There, students can take the classes necessary in order to transfer to four-year college institutions. The community college also has an award-winning nursing program for those wanting to become Registered Nurses. The MSJC Nursing Department has pathways from MSJC directly to Loma Linda Medical Center, Menifee Valley Medical Center, Temecula Valley Hospital, and Inland Valley Medical Center. University of Massachusetts Global has opened on the MSJC campus to offer Menifee its first four-year college.

Elementary schools

 Boulder Ridge Elementary
 Callie Kirkpatrick Elementary School
 Chester W. Morrison Elementary School
 Evans Ranch Elementary School
 Freedom Crest Elementary School
 Harvest Hill STEAM Academy
 Harvest Valley Elementary
 Herk Bouris Elementary School
 Mesa View Elementary
 Oak Meadows Elementary School
 Quail Valley Elementary School
 Ridgemoor Elementary School
 Romoland Elementary
 Southshore Elementary School
 Táawila Elementary School
 Bell Mountain Middle School
 Ethan A. Chase Middle School
 Hans Middle School
 Menifee Valley Middle School
 Paloma Valley High School
 Heritage High School
 Santa Rosa Academy

Universities and colleges
 Mt. San Jacinto College

Infrastructure

Transportation

Roads and highways

The primary routes in Menifee are Interstate 215 and Newport Road/Dominegoni Parkway. Scott Road, McCall Boulevard and Ethanac Road are also primary east–west travel streets in addition to State Route 74, which runs through the northern part of the city; Murrieta, Bradley, Haun, Antelope, and Menifee Roads are the main north–south thoroughfares. Improvements to the interchange at I-215 and Scott Road were completed in 2020. Other road improvements, such as a new interchange at Garbani Road and an overpass at Holland Road, are anticipated in the coming years.

Public transportation

Menifee has bus routes and Dial-A-Ride stops throughout the city to enhance mobility. RTA Routes 27, 40, 61, and 74 directly serve the Menifee area, linking it to other nearby cities including Temecula, Lake Elsinore, Hemet, and San Jacinto. Metrolink serves the area via the 91/Perris Valley Line, which ends at the South Perris Station, just north of the Menifee city limits. Metrolink has proposed an extension along existing railroad tracks through the northeastern corner of the city to Hemet, though it is unknown whether there will be a station in Menifee.

Health care
Emergency medical services in Menifee are provided by the 84-bed Menifee Global Medical Center, which is a licensed acute care hospital. It opened in 1989 and is located on McCall Boulevard in the northeastern part of the city.

Water
The city is provided water by the Eastern Municipal Water District. A desalination plant in the city treats underground water to produce drinking water.

Public safety
As of July 1, 2020, the City of Menifee ended its contract with the Riverside County Sheriff Department and started its own municipal police department. The Menifee Police Department is led by Chief of Police Pat Walsh.

The City of Menifee contracts for fire and paramedic services with the Riverside County Fire Department through a cooperative agreement with CAL FIRE. There are four fire stations in Menifee and each station has a paramedic engine company, and there is one medic patrol unit out of Fire Station #7 to assist with call volumes, as Station #7 is the 10th-busiest station in the nation. The Menifee Lakes station also has a truck company located there with specialized equipment for large structural fires.

Paramedic services are provided by American Medical Response, whose South Riverside Headquarters are located in Menifee.

Notable people
 Tony Burton - Actor
 Larry Fortensky - Construction worker and seventh husband of Elizabeth Taylor
 Warren G - Rapper and businessman
 Fernando Gonzalez - MMA fighter
 Steve Lamson - Motocross racer
 Phyllis Love - Actress
 Benny Mardones - Singer
 Jeremy McGrath - Motocross/Supercross Rider
 Mike Metzger - Motocross rider
 Jamal Morrow - Football player
 Audie Murphy - Soldier, actor, and songwriter
 Matthew Orzech - Football player
 Nia Sanchez - Model and Miss USA 2014
 Adam Watts - Songwriter, producer, recording artist, and mixing engineer
 Jeri Westerson - Author
 Bailey Sarian - YouTuber, Podcaster

References

External links

 
Cities in Riverside County, California
Populated places established in 2008
Incorporated cities and towns in California
2008 establishments in California